Meshir 25 - Coptic Calendar - Meshir 27

The twenty-sixth day of the Coptic month of Meshir, the sixth month of the Coptic year. In common years, this day corresponds to February 20, of the Julian Calendar, and March 5, of the Gregorian Calendar. This day falls in the Coptic Season of Shemu, the season of the Harvest.

Commemorations

Prophets 

 The departure of the Righteous Hosea the Prophet

Martyrs 

 The martyrdom of Saint Zadok and the 128 who were with him 
 The martyrdom of Saints Tyranius and Silvanus the Bishops, Saint Zinopius the Priest, and their companions in the city of Tyre

References 

Days of the Coptic calendar